The Practice is an American legal drama television series created by David E. Kelley centering on partners and associates at a Boston law firm. The show ran for eight seasons on ABC, from March 4, 1997, to May 16, 2004. It won an Emmy in 1998 and 1999 for Outstanding Drama Series, and spawned the spin-off series Boston Legal, which ran for five more seasons (from 2004 to 2008).

Conflict between legal ethics and personal morality was a recurring theme with light comedy being occasionally present. Kelley claimed that he conceived the show as something of a rebuttal to L.A. Law and its romanticized treatment of the American legal system and legal proceedings.

Overview 
In season 1, Robert Donnell and Associates features Bobby Donnell as the sole senior partner. Ellenor Frutt, Eugene Young and Lindsay Dole are his associates. Rebecca Washington is the firm's receptionist. Later, Jimmy Berluti is hired as an associate.

In season 2, Eugene, Lindsay and Ellenor become partners. Robert Donnell and Associates becomes Donnell, Young, Dole and Frutt. Helen Gamble, an assistant district attorney, becomes regularly entangled in the cases and personal lives of the employees of the firm.

In season 3, Rebecca Washington, who had been attending law school in secret, becomes an associate after passing the bar exam. Lucy Hatcher is then hired as the new receptionist.

In season 4, Assistant District Attorney Richard Bay, like Helen, becomes a frequent ally and opponent of Donnell, Young, Dole and Frutt.

In season 5, Lucy becomes a rape crisis counselor in addition to her job as the firm's receptionist. Richard Bay is later assassinated after refusing to throw a murder trial.

In season 6, Assistant District Attorney Alan Lowe becomes an antagonist of the firm for a short period of time.

In season 7, Lindsay leaves Donnell, Young, Dole and Frutt to start a new law firm with Claire Wyatt. To fill the void left by Lindsay, Jamie Stringer is hired as an associate. Bobby later leaves the firm.

In season 8, Donnell, Young, Dole and Frutt has been renamed to Young, Frutt and Berluti. Eugene has taken Bobby's place as a senior partner. Lucy has left the firm to become a full-time rape crisis counselor. Rebecca has also left the firm for unknown reasons. Helen is no longer present at the firm's cases. Tara Wilson is hired as a paralegal, and Alan Shore becomes an associate. After firing Alan and Tara – as well as being sued by the former – Young, Frutt and Berluti dissolve. Eugene then becomes a judge. Ellenor focuses her attention on motherhood. Jimmy and Jamie begin a new firm. Alan and Tara are hired by another firm known as Crane, Poole and Schmidt.

Main cast 

 Dylan McDermott as Bobby Donnell (seasons 1–7; guest season 8), the senior partner of the firm who struggles with his conscience and the idea of being a lawyer.
 LisaGay Hamilton as Rebecca Washington (seasons 1–7), the firm's first receptionist and paralegal. She later passed the bar exam and became an associate.
 Steve Harris as Eugene Young, the second highest-ranking partner at the firm and later senior partner who is more strongly devoted to the letter of the law and legal ethics than his colleagues.
 Camryn Manheim as Ellenor Frutt, an associate and later senior partner at the firm who brought in various nefarious clients. A recurring gag on the show was that the men she dated often turned out to be murderers.
 Kelli Williams as Lindsay Dole (seasons 1–7), an associate at the firm and, later, wife of Bobby Donnell.
 Michael Badalucco as Jimmy Berluti, an associate and later partner at the firm from a working-class background. Jimmy often struggles with his conscience, loneliness, feelings of inadequacy, and a gambling addiction. One episode had him briefly considering bisexuality before he decided that he was heterosexual.
 Lara Flynn Boyle as Helen Gamble (seasons 2–7), an Assistant District Attorney and friend of the firm partners who was relentless in her attempts to prosecute those who do wrong.
 Marla Sokoloff as Lucy Hatcher (seasons 3–7; recurring season 8), the firm's wise-cracking, nosy receptionist who was hired after Rebecca became an attorney. She later became a part-time counselor for rape victims in addition to her job as a receptionist.
 Jason Kravits as Richard Bay (season 5; recurring season 4), a diminutive, hard-nosed Assistant District Attorney who believed in the guilt of all those he prosecuted.
 Ron Livingston as Alan Lowe (season 6), an Assistant District Attorney who replaced Richard Bay.
 Jessica Capshaw as Jamie Stringer (seasons 7–8), a high-strung, promiscuous Harvard Law School graduate and associate at the firm.
 Chyler Leigh as Claire Wyatt (season 7), Lindsay's associate at her new practice.
 Rhona Mitra as Tara Wilson (season 8), a paralegal and law student. She would later appear in Boston Legal as an attorney.
 James Spader as Alan Shore (season 8), an amoral associate and an old friend of Ellenor. He would later appear in Boston Legal.

Recurring cast 

 Ray Abruzzo as Detective Mike McGuire (45 episodes)
 Holland Taylor as Judge Roberta Kittleson (29 episodes)
 Linda Hunt as Judge Zoey Hiller (23 episodes)
 Bill Smitrovich as A.D.A. Kenneth Walsh (22 episodes)
 Richard McGonagle as Judge Patrick Wilcox (16 episodes)
 James Pickens, Jr. as Detective Mike McKrew (15 episodes)
 Frank Birney as Judge Warren West (14 episodes)
 Herb Mitchell as Judge Rodney White (12 episodes)
 Michael Monks as George Vogelman (11 episodes)
 Edward Herrmann as Anderson Pearson (10 episodes)
 Anna Gunn as A.D.A. Jean Ward (10 episodes)
 Kate Burton as A.D.A. Susan Alexander (9 episodes)
 Bruce Davison as Scott Wallace (9 episodes)
 Paul Dooley as Judge Philip Swackheim (8 episodes)
 Lynn Hamilton as Judge Fulton (7 episodes)
 Billee Thomas as Kendall Young (7 episodes)
 Susan Blommaert as Judge Rudy Fox (7 episodes)
 Steven Gilborn as A.D.A. Gavin Bullock (6 episodes)
 Vince Colosimo as Matthew Billings (6 episodes)

Notable guest stars 

The series holds the Emmy Awards record for most wins in the Guest Actor and Actress categories for a single series, as well as most nominations in those categories. Emmys went to John Larroquette, Edward Herrmann, James Whitmore, Beah Richards, Michael Emerson, Charles S. Dutton, Alfre Woodard, Sharon Stone and William Shatner. In addition, Tony Danza, Paul Dooley, Henry Winkler, Marlee Matlin, René Auberjonois and Betty White were nominated but did not win. Larroquette, who won for his guest appearance during the second season, was nominated again for an episode from the sixth season, but did not win. The series won the Outstanding Guest Actor in a Drama Series for five consecutive years (from 1998 to 2002).

 Gabrielle Anwar as Katie Defoe
 Ed Asner as Judge Matlin Pratt / Judge Marcus Winnaker
 René Auberjonois as Judge Mantz
 Dylan Baker as Keith Ellison
 Kathy Baker as Evelyn Mayfield
 Lake Bell as Sally Heep
 Gil Bellows as Billy Thomas
 Tempestt Bledsoe as Roberta Baylor
 Andre Braugher as Ben Gideon
 Christian Clemenson as Barry Wall
 Jon Cryer as Terry Pender
 Tony Danza as Tommy Silva
 Viola Davis as Aisha Crenshaw
 Bruce Davison as Scott Wallace
 Rebecca De Mornay as Hannah Rose
 Patrick Dempsey as Paul Stewart
 Charles Durning as Stephen Donnell
 Charles S. Dutton as Leonard Marshall
 Aunjanue Ellis as Sharon Young
 Michael Emerson as William Hinks
 Giancarlo Esposito as Ray McMurphy
 Calista Flockhart as Ally McBeal
 Billy Gardell as Manny Quinn
 Gina Gershon as Glenn Hall
 Anthony Heald as Wallace Cooper/Scott Guber
 Doug Hutchison as Jackie Cahill
 John Larroquette as Joey Heric
 Virginia Madsen as Marsha Ellison
 Marlee Matlin as Sally Berg
 Chi McBride as Steven Harper
 Thomas McCarthy as Kevin Riley
 Paul McCrane as Martin Parks
 John C. McGinley as Leonard Good
 Leslie Moonves as Himself
 Chris O'Donnell as Brad Stanfield
 Vincent Pastore as Lenny Pescatore
 Teri Polo as Sarah Barker
 CCH Pounder as Helene Washington
 Kim Raver as Victoria Keenan
 Christopher Reeve as Kevin Beally
 Beah Richards as Gertrude Turner
 Ernie Sabella as Harland Bassett
 William Shatner as Denny Crane
 Sharon Stone as Sheila Carlisle
 Rider Strong as Gary Armbrust
 Ralph Waite as Walter Josephson
 Betty White as Catherine Piper
 James Whitmore as Raymond Oz
 Henry Winkler as Henry Olson
 Alfre Woodard as Denise Freeman
 D. B. Woodside as Aaron Wilton

Budget reduction and major revamp 
By the end of the seventh season, faced with sagging ratings, ABC conditioned the show's renewal on a drastic budget reduction. As a result, Dylan McDermott, Kelli Williams, Lara Flynn Boyle, Chyler Leigh, Marla Sokoloff, and LisaGay Hamilton were fired as regulars. McDermott and Sokoloff reappeared as special guest stars and a recurring character respectively in the eighth season. The addition of James Spader and Rhona Mitra to the cast somewhat revived the ratings as Spader went on to win an Emmy for his appearance. However, ABC announced that The Practice would not return for a ninth season on March 11, 2004. Instead, Kelley would create a new spin-off series called Boston Legal which starred Spader, Mitra, Lake Bell and William Shatner.

Episodes 

The Practice had 8 seasons and a total of 168 episodes.

Crossovers 

 "Axe Murderer" (S02E26) – The lawyers of Robert Donnell and Associates work with the lawyers of Cage & Fish on a case in which a woman is accused of killing a wealthy client who may have been Lizzie Borden in a past life. The case had begun on Ally McBeal: "The Inmates" (S01E20).
 "The Day After" (S05E14) – Ellenor Frutt and Jimmy Berlutti are hired to represent Coach Riley, who's been fired from Winslow High for withholding information about Milton Buttle's affair. The hearing happens on Boston Public: "Chapter Thirteen" (S01E13).
 "Gideon's Crossover" (S05E16) – When Ellenor Frutt has trouble with her pregnancy, Dr. Ben Gideon helps out in Gideon's Crossing: "Flashpoint" (S01E17).

Additionally, Bobby Donnell (Dylan McDermott) appears in the Ally McBeal season 1 finale "These Are the Days", while Lara Flynn Boyle and Michael Badalucco each make cameos in "Making Spirits Bright" and "I Know Him by Heart".

Lara Flynn Boyle had an uncredited guest appearance as a rebuttal witness, opposite of guest star Heather Locklear's character in the season 5 episode "Tom Dooley".

Home media 
The Practice, Volume 1, was released as a four-disc DVD set in North America on June 12, 2007. The set includes all six episodes of season 1 and the first seven episodes of season 2. It also includes a featurette, "Setting Up The Practice". The set was also released in Region 4 on June 6, 2007 and in Region 2 on June 29, 2008.

On January 3, 2014, it was announced that Shout! Factory had acquired the rights to the series in Region 1 and would release the final season on DVD on April 15, 2014.

In 2012, Medium Rare Entertainment acquired the rights to the series in Region 2 and released the first and second seasons on DVD in the United Kingdom on February 27, 2012.

In 2014, StudioCanal released the first and second seasons over three volumes in Germany with German and English audio. The third, fourth, and eighth seasons have also been released in 2016 with plans to release the fifth and sixth at a later date.

Volume 1 was released in Italy and Greece on July 1, 2007.

In March 2019, all seasons and episodes of The Practice were released on the streaming service Amazon Prime Video. By 2021, seasons 1–8 became available on the streaming service Hulu.

U.S. television viewership 
Viewer numbers per season of The Practice on ABC.

Note: Each US network television season starts in late September and ends in late May, which coincides with the completion of May sweeps. The first two seasons include the household rating. Seasons 4 and 5 reached the top 10 rankings.

The exposure from its January 30, 2000, post-Super Bowl episode (attracting 23.8 million viewers) plus their weekly lead-in from early 2000 to mid-2001, the then mega-hit Who Wants to Be a Millionaire, helped the series reach its ratings peak.

Series High: 15.4 rating/23.8 million viewers
lead in: Super Bowl: Post Game — 25.6 rating
Series Low:  4.9 rating/7.3 million
Series Debut: 11.3 rating/16.1 million viewers
Series Finale: 7.5 rating/10.9 million viewers

Awards and nominations

References

External links 

 
 
 
 USA Today Photo Gallery

 
1990s American workplace drama television series
1997 American television series debuts
2000s American workplace drama television series
2004 American television series endings
American Broadcasting Company original programming
American legal drama television series
1990s American legal television series
2000s American legal television series
Best Drama Series Golden Globe winners
Edgar Award-winning works
English-language television shows
Peabody Award-winning television programs
Primetime Emmy Award for Outstanding Drama Series winners
Primetime Emmy Award-winning television series
Super Bowl lead-out shows
Television series by 20th Century Fox Television
Television shows set in Boston
Television series created by David E. Kelley
Television shows filmed in Boston
Television series about prosecutors